The C&C Landfall 39 is a sailboat that was designed by C&C Design and Robert Perry and first built in 1985. The boat has a centre cockpit deck layout, which allows for an aft cabin interior.

The design is sometimes confused with the Ron Amy-designed 1974 boat of the same name, although the two designs are unrelated.

Production
The design was built by the Canadian company C&C Yachts, at their Rhode Island, United States plant. At least 15 examples of the design were completed between 1985 and 1989, but it is now out of production.

Design
The C&C Landfall 39 is a recreational keelboat, built predominantly of fibreglass. It has a masthead sloop rig, a raked stem, a  near-vertical transom, a skeg-mounted rudder controlled by a wheel and a fixed fin keel. It displaces  and carries  of lead ballast.

Accommodations
Gregg Nestor, writing in Cruising World in 2011 said of the design: "With the exception of a cavernous lazarette, almost the entire hull of the Landfall 39 is devoted to accommodations. The quality of the joinery is above average, and areas of white laminate accent the varnished teak and go far toward keeping the interior bright. Headroom is well over 6 feet, and there are overhead grab rails for safety.
The companionway ladder leads directly into the spacious main saloon, where settees outboard face a substantial centerline drop-leaf table. Aft on the starboard side of the main saloon there’s a large aft-facing navigation station and chart table. The area is well lit by the two large deadlights and a pair of opening portlights. Two dorade vents provide additional ventilation.

Forward of the saloon, a short passageway leads to the forward cabin and its generous V-berth. The head compartment is to starboard of the passageway, and a hanging locker lies to port.

The galley is in the port-side passageway that leads to the aft cabin. A double sink and a small counter are behind the companionway ladder, while the three-burner stove, more counter space, and the large, top-loading refrigerator/freezer are outboard.

The aft cabin offers very private quarters with an athwartships double berth, numerous stowage spaces, and its own head compartment. Four opening portlights and an overhead opening hatch provide illumination and ventilation."

See also

 List of sailing boat types

References

External links
 Original Factory Brochure - C&C Landfall 39
 Original Factory Standard Equipment - C&C Landfall 39

Keelboats
1980s sailboat type designs
Sailing yachts
Sailboat type designs by C&C Design
Sailboat type designs by Robert Perry
Sailboat types built by C&C Yachts